The Lowland Tanker Company was a British shipping company operating a small fleet of oil tankers on time-charter to BP.

History
In 1950 the  British Tanker Company, for managerial and economic reasons,  formed a separate associated company to operate ten oil tankers exclusively for BP cargos.  BTC owned 50% of the company with 25% owned by Matheson, the maritime arm of Jardine Matheson, and 25% by the Newcastle ship-owners, Common Brothers, the latter company being tasked with the management of the ships.  A further 5 ships were bought in the early 1960s. The ships were taken over by the BP Tanker Company, successors to BTC, in 1976 with the minority shareholders in the company being bought out by BP in 1979.

Ships
The first ten ships were constructed in the traditional style with the bridge and accommodation block in the centre of the ship and the engine rooms aft.  The last five were built in what is now the standard layout, with all the superstructure aft leaving the tank deck clear. To distinguish them from BTC's own ships they had a tartan band painted on the funnel.  After BPTC took them in-house the band was retained but with a BP logo superimposed on it.

Fleet list

References

Anglo-Persian Oil Company
Former BP subsidiaries
Defunct shipping companies of the United Kingdom
Ships of BP Shipping
Tanker shipping companies